The 2010–11 New Mexico State Aggies men's basketball team represented New Mexico State University in the 2010–11 college basketball season. This was Marvin Menzies 4th season as head coach. The Aggies played their home games at Pan American Center and competed in the Western Athletic Conference. They finished the season 16–17, 8–8 in WAC play.

Roster

2010–11 Schedule and results
Source
All times are Mountain

|-
!colspan=9 style=| Exhibition

|-
!colspan=9 style=| Regular season

|-
!colspan=9 style=| 2011 WAC Men's Basketball Tournament

References

New Mexico State
New Mexico State Aggies men's basketball seasons
Aggies
Aggies